Alberto Marchetti (born December 16, 1954) is an Italian professional football coach and a former player who played as a central midfielder.

He began his career with Arezzo before joining Juventus, although his first-team games would be limited and he also spent a season playing with Novara in Serie B.

Marchetti joined Cagliari in 1977 and spent six seasons at the club, winning promotion to Serie A in 1979. After relegation in 1983, he would join Udinese where he partnered Zico in midfield for one season. He joined Ascoli and played for three seasons (winning promotion in 1986) before returning to Novara to finish his career.

Honours
 Serie A champion: 1976/77.
 UEFA Cup winner: 1976/77.

Italian footballers
1954 births
Living people
Serie A players
S.S. Arezzo players
Novara F.C. players
Juventus F.C. players
Cagliari Calcio players
Udinese Calcio players
Ascoli Calcio 1898 F.C. players
UEFA Cup winning players
Italian football managers
Association football midfielders
Sportspeople from Arezzo
Footballers from Tuscany